劍 (Japanese simplified form 剣, Chinese simplified form 剑), the Chinese character for "double edged sword", may refer to:
Jian 劍, 剑
Tsurugi (sword) 剣
Korean sword 검, 劍
Shinken 真剣
Kenjutsu 剣術
Kendo 剣道
Gumdo 劍道

See also
刀 (disambiguation)
儉 jiǎn "temperate, frugal, economical"